Hydraecia ultima is a moth belonging to the family Noctuidae. The species was first described by P. L. Holst in 1965.

It is native to Eurasia.

References

Apameini